Kantara may refer to:

 Kantara (film), a 2022 Kannada-language film
 Kantara (soundtrack), a soundtrack to the 2022 film
 El Kantara, a town in Algeria
 El Kantara District, Algeria
 Kantara Castle, a medieval castle in Cyprus
 Kantara, İskele, a village in Cyprus
 El Qantara, Egypt
 Kantara or Mahakantara, names used in the Mahabharata for Maraguda, a valley in India
 Qantara, Lebanon
 Kantara Initiative, an IT consortium for interoperable digital identity systems

See also
 Kantar (disambiguation)
 Qantara (disambiguation)